Yours, Mine or Ours is an American reality television series that premiered on October 3, 2016, on the Bravo cable network. The series stars real estate agent Reza Farahan (known for appearing on Shahs of Sunset) and interior decorator Taylor Spellman who "help couples, living under separate roofs, figure out which residence they should call home".

Episodes

References

External links 
 

2010s American reality television series
2016 American television series debuts
2016 American television series endings
Bravo (American TV network) original programming
English-language television shows